First Harrogate Trains was a proposed open access operator with ambitions to run passenger services between Harrogate and London King's Cross via York.

The company proposed to run from Harrogate to London King's Cross with up to four services each way per day. The application to run trains was rejected by the Office of Rail Regulation in February 2009. It cited that the services would not bring enough new patronage and thus rely on abstracting revenue from existing train operating companies.

In 2009, it was rejected by the Office of Rail Regulations.

Had FHT been successful, it was intended that services would have commenced in the summer of 2009.
First Harrogate Trains was a subsidiary of Hull Trains, owned by FirstGroup (80%) and Renaissance Trains (20%).

Rolling stock
The preferred rolling stock to be used was Class 180 Adelante or Class 222 Pioneer trains, the types used by Hull Trains previously.

References

 FirstGroup railway companies
Open-access train operating companies
Renaissance Trains